The national treasures of Singapore are artifacts deemed to have significant historical importance to the country of Singapore.

List
Below is a list of artifacts considered to be National Treasures by the National Museum of Singapore.

References